Fire is a serious hazard in shack settlements in South Africa. It has been argued that "On average in South Africa over the last five years there are ten shack fires a day with someone dying in a shack fire every other day." In 2011, 151 were reported to have been killed in shack fires in Cape Town. It was reported that in 2014, 2,090 people burned to death in the Gauteng province, "many of them in shack fires that sweep through informal settlements".

Causes of shack fires

Shack fires are often termed accidents but this has been contested by shack dweller's organisations. Martin J. Murray argues that by "recruiting human frailty or sheer accident to their cause, key city-builders have been able to rationalize municipal policy-choices that have accomplished little toward changing the circumstances under which the urban poor—who bear the awful brunt of these continuing cycles of death and destruction — tend to invariably find themselves in harm’s way."

Matt Birkinshaw lists the key reasons for shack fires as lack of land, lack of housing, denial of access to electricity, adequate water and to adequate emergency services.

Responses to shack fires

The charitable NGO 'Children of Fire' offers support for victims of fires, and in particular to children.

The shack dwellers' social movement Abahlali baseMjondolo has campaigned against what it perceives as the failure of the state to address the problem of shack fires and organised people to connect themselves directly to the electricity grid.

Further reading 
 Shack Fires are No Accident, School of Development Studies, University of KwaZulu-Natal, 2005
 The Solution to Shack Fires is Electrification, Not More Training, South African Civil Society Information Service, 2008
 A Big Devil in the Jondolos: A report on shack fires, by Matt Birkinshaw, Abahlali baseMjondolo, 2008
 
 
 'Getting electricity was so exciting', Interview with Zodwa Nsibande, The Guardian (UK), 2011
 In the wake of the Makause shack fire, the destitute and forgotten, The Daily Maverick, 2012
 Shack fires: A devil in the detail of development, The Daily Maverick, 2013
 Are some Cape Town fires hotter than others?, Rebecca Davis, The Daily Maverick, 2015
 "Where there is fire, there is politics": Ungovernability and Material Life in Urban South Africa, Kerry Chance, Cultural Anthropology, 2015

Notes and references

Slums in South Africa
Housing in South Africa
Human rights abuses in South Africa
Society of South Africa
Urban planning in South Africa
Fires in South Africa